Lanny Gare (born September 5, 1978) is a Canadian-born German professional ice hockey centre. He is currently playing in the German lower leagues with Löwen Frankfurt.

He is the nephew of former National Hockey League winger Danny Gare.

Awards and honours

References

External links

1978 births
Living people
Canadian ice hockey centres
Dayton Bombers players
Fresno Falcons players
German ice hockey players
Hershey Bears players
Ice hockey people from British Columbia
New Hampshire Wildcats men's ice hockey players
Sportspeople from Vernon, British Columbia
Quad City Mallards (UHL) players
Victoria Salmon Kings players
AHCA Division I men's ice hockey All-Americans